, also known as Iyahiko-jinja is a Shinto shrine in the Yahiko neighborhood of the village of Yahiko, Nishikanbara District, Niigata Prefecture, Japan. It is one of the three shrines which claim the title of ichinomiya of former  Echigo Province.  The shrine's annual festival is held on February 2.  This shrine standing at the foot of a mountain is popularly known as a power spot for love and good fortune  
  
The shrine is located within Sado-Yahiko-Yoneyama Quasi-National Park and is on the eastern base of Mount Yahiko, a 634-meter sacred mountain which forms the shintai of the shrine.

Enshrined kami
The kami enshrined at Yahiko Jinja is:
 
Beppyo shrines

History
The foundation date of Yahiko Shrine is unknown, but the shrine dates to prehistoric times as it us referred to as "ancient" in a poem even in the Nara period Man'yōshū. Per the shrine's legend, Ame-no-Kaguyama-no-mikoto landed from the heavens at Nozumihama (in what is now the city of Nagaoka) and taught local people about industries such as fishing, salt production, rice cultivation, and sericulture.  He was later was enshrined on Mount Yahiko as the kami who founded Echigo. He also was recorded in the Kojiki as having performed a bugaku dance at the coronation of Emperor Jimmu. Ame-no-Kaguyama-no-mikoto is also claimed to be the ancestor of the Owari Kuni no miyatsuko and it is more than likely that the shrine legend and tradition confuses this kami with Prince Ohiko (大彦命), the ancestor of the Hokuriku Kuni no miyatsuko. 

The shrine is mentioned in and entry for 833 AD in Shoku Nihon Kōki and per the same source, the shrine was awarded the rank of Junior 5th Rank, Lower Grade (従五位下) in 842 AD. Per the Nihon Sandai Jitsuroku, it was promoted to Junior 4th Rank, Lower Grade in 861 AD and its name appears in the Engishiki records compiled in 927 AD. The subsequent history of the shrine is uncertain and often contradictory, as most old records have been lost in fires and other disasters over the years. The shrine was well patronised by the military class, and the shrine treasury has a Muromachi period Ōdachi Japanese sword which is an Important Cultural Property of Japan as well as amor and swords donated by Minamoto no Yoriie, Minamoto no Yoshitsune and Uesugi Kenshin.  

During the Edo period, the daimyō of Takada Domain, Matsudaira Tadateru granted the shrine estates with a  kokudaka of 500 koku for its upkeep/ During the Edo Period, the kokugaku scholar Hirata Atsutane claimed that the shrine had preserved in Jindai moji, predating the introduction of Chinese-based kanji, but that these records had been lost in a fire.

After the Meiji restoration and the establishment of State Shinto, the shrine was designated a  under the Modern system of ranked Shinto Shrines in 1871. The present shrine structures were rebuilt in 1916.  The earlier shrine buildings were destroyed by a 1912 fire which started in the village.

The shrine is located a 15-minute walk from Yahiko Station o the JR East Yahiko Line.

Gallery

Cultural Properties

Important Cultural Properties
, Edo Period, completed in 1694. This is a sub-shrine located within the precincts of the Yahiko Jinja with a thatched nagare-zukuri roof. It was designated as a National Important Cultural Property in 1917.

, Muromachi period, dated 1415, blade length of 220.4 cm.  

, Kamakura period, dated 1326

See also
 List of Shinto shrines in Japan
 Ichinomiya

References

External links 

Official home page 
Niigata Prefecture Kanko Navi 

Shinto shrines in Niigata Prefecture
Important Cultural Properties of Japan
Echigo Province
Yahiko, Niigata
Ichinomiya